Antonio Hartmann Baeza is a Chilean former professional tennis player.

Hartmann is one of three brothers and is of Hungarian descent through his father, an immigrant to Chile.

Active in the 1970s and 1980s, Hartmann played collegiate tennis in the United States for Pan American University, after which he competed on the professional tour, making appearances at Wimbledon and the French Open.

References

External links
 
 

Year of birth missing (living people)
Living people
Chilean male tennis players
Chilean people of Hungarian descent
University of Texas–Pan American alumni